is a Japanese footballer who plays as a forward for Nankatsu SC.

Career
Noto was born in Osaka, Japan, and has played for SV Gonsenheim, the Hannover 96 reserve team, Buriram United, and Chainat F.C.

References

External links

Profile at Nankatsu SC

1990 births
Living people
Association football people from Osaka Prefecture
People from Hirakata
Japanese footballers
J2 League players
JEF United Chiba players
SV Gonsenheim players
Nankatsu SC players
Association football forwards